"Squeeze Me" is a 1925 jazz standard composed by Fats Waller. It was based on an old blues song called "The Boy in the Boat". The lyrics were credited to publisher Clarence Williams, although Andy Razaf has claimed to have actually written the lyrics.

The song has been recorded by numerous artists, including Louis Armstrong, Mildred Bailey, Count Basie, Eddie Condon, Harry James, James P. Johnson, Bessie Smith, Jimmy Smith, Willie "The Lion" Smith, Dinah Washington, Tuba Skinny and Maria Muldaur.

See also
List of 1920s jazz standards

Notes

1925 songs
Jazz songs
1920s jazz standards
Songs with music by Fats Waller
Bessie Smith songs
Mildred Bailey songs